World Poetry Tree: An Anthology for Hope, Love and Peace is a global poetry anthology published in 2022 edited by Arab poet Adel Khozam  with the support of the UAE Ministry of Culture and Youth.  According to Emirates News Agency, this book will go down in the history of world exhibitions as the first initiative of its kind to collect in an anthology the works of literary luminaries from all continents.

The 1000pages anthology includes works by 405 poets from 106 countries.

In August 2022, Adel Khozam was awarded the Best International Poet Award for compiling the anthology, according to the results of voting by the Committee of the International Center for Translation and Poetry Research in China.

References

2022 anthologies
Poetry anthologies